The Shadow King (Amahl Farouk) is a supervillain appearing in American comic books published by Marvel Comics. The character is particularly associated with the X-Men family of comics. His nemesis is the X-Men's leader, Professor X, while he also figures into the backstory of the X-Man Storm. As originally introduced, Farouk was a human mutant from Egypt who used  his vast telepathic abilities for evil, taking the alias Shadow King. Later writers established Farouk as only the modern incarnation of an ancient evil entity that has been around since the dawn of humanity, who became one with Farouk when he grew older.

The character has appeared in various adaptations of X-Men stories, including X-Men: The Animated Series and Wolverine and the X-Men.

Farouk made his live-action debut in the television series Legion, portrayed by Aubrey Plaza and Navid Negahban, where he was the show's primary antagonist.

Publication history

Created by writer Chris Claremont and illustrator/co-writer John Byrne, the character the Shadow King first appeared in Uncanny X-Men #117 (January 1979) as the telepathic mutant Amahl Farouk.

X-Treme X-Men and X-Men: True Friends reveal the Shadow King to be an entity of the astral plane which has existed since the dawn of humanity, an ethereal demon preferring to enslave the bodies of telepaths and psychics and use their capabilities to enslave others.  As a side effect of its greed, hedonism and lack of self-control, the Shadow King's long-term telepathic hosts are often morbidly obese.

Fictional character biography
The Shadow King's origins are unclear. All that is known is that he was living in Morocco until the 1800s before taking Farouk as a host. He claims to be a multiversal manifestation of the dark side of the human consciousnesses, spawned by the first nightmare, and has since been feeding on the shadows in their souls, transferring from host to host since the dawn of humanity.

For many years, the Shadow King's primary human manifestation was Amahl Farouk. When Amahl Farouk's powers developed he could psychically control those around him, and merged with the Shadow King. As Farouk, the Shadow King originally confronted Professor X (inspiring him to form the X-Men).

As Amahl Farouk in the 1930s
The Shadow King was known as Amahl Farouk in 1931, working for two of Adolf Hitler's special agents (Wolfgang von Strucker and Geist). Von Strucker and Geist planned to dethrone King Edward of England and replace him with a fascist ruler sympathetic to Hitler. When Farouk conducted a mystical ceremony, he accidentally brought back Phoenix Force host Rachel Summers and her teammate Shadowcat (also known as Kitty Pryde). Von Strucker began to doubt Farouk's abilities. The Shadow King quickly possessed Rachel Summers and, as Shadowcat escaped, allied herself with Alasdhair Kinross. Farouk kidnapped the heir to the throne, Lilibet, and fled to Edinburgh. When Shadowcat tried to reach Summers telepathically, she found Farouk in control. Pryde surprised Farouk by calling him "Shadow King", enabling her to escape. Farouk took control of Kinross and tried to kill them both, but Pryde used her phasing powers to disrupt Kinross's nervous system and knock him out.  
 
Although Farouk was going to sacrifice Kinross to demons in return for a spell which would annihilate the English monarchy, he was interrupted by Kitty and his crystal knife shattered. The demons entered Farouk's body, overpowering him. He began dispersing energy, killing all the Nazi soldiers; von Strucker accused him of treason and tried to shoot him. Farouk transformed into the Shadow King and tried to force Pryde and Kinross to fight, but they were saved by a young Logan. Phoenix unleashed her power on Farouk, but she was subdued and possessed. Lilibet escaped, fleeing to Holyrood House. Farouk possessed the house's servants and sent them and Phoenix in pursuit. Logan ambushed Farouk, von Strucker and Geist, but Farouk had Summers and the servants attack him. Farouk then possessed Pryde and Lilibet. 
 
Pryde began talking about the future and the fall of Hitler; Lilibet attacked Farouk, disabling him enough for Pryde to disrupt his nervous system (stunning them both and giving Summers time to regain control of herself). Farouk recovered and tried to retake his prisoners, but Phoenix fought on the astral plane. Phoenix was going to kill him when Pryde struck them with the Sword of Scones, causing them to return to their bodies; Farouk's body was supposedly destroyed by an energy blast from the sword but later when questioned by Rachel if they had killed Farouk, Pryde reveals that they had for the moment only weakened him.

Confrontation with Charles Xavier
In 1971, Farouk returned and met V-Battalion leader James Watkins Jr. Watkins offered him V-Battalion support if Farouk could obtain information about the Everlasting. Farouk gave Watkins the name of Marduk.

Farouk became a crime lord in Egypt, controlling Cairo's Thieves Quarter (where a young Charles Xavier's pocket was picked by a child, Ororo Munroe). After Xavier stopped her and retrieved his wallet, he was struck by a bolt of psionic energy. When he recovered, he discovered that the source of the attack was a nearby tavern (where he met Farouk). Sitting at separate tables, they conversed telepathically. Farouk told Xavier that he sensed another telepath nearby, and the attack was a warning to stay clear of the area. 
 
He unsuccessfully tried to persuade Xavier to join him in his criminal activities; Xavier believed that people with such gifts should use them to better the world. They assumed astral form, and Xavier defeated Farouk on the astral plane with a fatal psionic attack. Farouk was Xavier's first encounter with an evil mutant, which led to the formation of the X-Men. His psyche still on the Astral plane, Farouk awaited another chance to fight Xavier (whom he now feared).

New Mutants
The Shadow King became aware of a young mutant, Karma, a member of Xavier's New Mutants with the psychic ability to possess other beings. In one of the team's earliest missions, Karma was apparently killed in an explosion at the Viper's hideout. However, the Shadow King used Karma's powers against her to possess her.

As Karma, the Shadow King rebuilt his worldwide empire while indulging his gluttony through her body. He used her to control the Gladiators, a group of mutants, by using a holographic image of leader Alexander Flynn.

The Shadow King used the Gladiators to abduct Magma and Sunspot, forcing them to fight each other until teammates Cannonball, Shadowcat, Dazzler, and Magik tried to rescue them. In their battle to escape the Gladiators, Cannonball and Shadowcat recognized their obese antagonist as Karma (not realizing that she was controlled by the Shadow King).

The team followed Karma to Madripoor, where they were subjected to Karma's mind control (augmented by the Shadow King). The remaining New Mutants and Storm fought their teammates in Cairo, where Karma took control of Storm and Mirage. Magik, realizing that Karma was possessed by the Shadow King, released her teammates from Karma's control and Karma from the Shadow King. After losing his host, the Shadow King transferred to Cypher; Karma entered the astral plane, apparently destroying his astral form.

Muir Island saga
The Shadow King resurfaced many years later in the body of deceased FBI agent Jacob Reisz when Storm had been sent back to childhood by the Nanny and woke up with amnesia. Forge used meditation to enter the astral plane, discovering that Storm was still alive but at the cost of his cybernetic arm. When the Shadow King tried to claim the child, he was questioned about his motives, at which point he killed a man and framed Storm. On Muir Island, the telepath Legion used Cerebro to look for Storm and the other X-Men when the Shadow King attacked and possessed him; he also controlled Moira MacTaggert and Valerie Cooper, after which he sent Valerie Cooper to kill Mystique. 
 
The Shadow King set a trap to capture Storm. Her youth gave her less control of her mutant powers, and when he tried to possess her mind she involuntarily hit him with a lightning bolt, but he soon found her with Gambit. They worked together to fight him, escaping with the Shadow King's hounds in pursuit. Mystique defeated Valerie Cooper and impersonated her, appearing on television to report Mystique's death. Part of Carol Danvers separated from Rogue and traveled to Muir Island, where she was forced to fight Legion and Moira MacTaggert, when she emerged from the Siege Perilous in the X-Men's former Australian hideout. Although she defeated them, she was possessed by the Shadow King. He compelled her to go to the Savage Land to find Rogue, but she was defeated on arrival by Magneto. The Shadow King, with his ambitious schemes, was afraid of being identified by other telepaths. He needed a nexus between the astral and psionic planes to generate a disturbance which would affect other telepaths. Polaris' powers had been recently altered by Zaladane, and he chose Polaris as his nexus.

Jean Grey tried to access the astral plane with Cerebro, but the Shadow King overrode Cerebro's defenses and noticed that Jean had lost her telepathic powers and was helpless. He tried to turn her into his Shadow Queen, but Psylocke unaware of who he was, threatened him with her psi-blade but ended using it on Jean instead, returning her to the physical world; however, they could not remember the details of the encounter and his identity was not yet compromised. His control over Muir Island was only uncovered when Professor X probed Colossus' mind after the latter tried to kill him.

The X-Men sent a task force which included Storm, Forge, Gambit, Banshee, Wolverine and Jubilee to remove his influence. The Shadow King sent his slaves to defend the island, and they defeated the invaders. Xavier understood that he needed a human host and a nexus to continue his exploits, and planned to cut both the links. Mystique revealed herself and shot Jacob Reisz in the head, destroying his brain and killing the Shadow King's human host. Due to shock and the removal of the Shadow King's host, Legion became unstable. X-Factor discovered that his nexus was Polaris, but the Shadow King took possession of Legion. He ordered the slaves to hide underground because he was going to use Legion's power to destroy the surface of Muir Island. Jean Grey's telekinesis protected X-Factor and the X-Men.

Xavier then used Jean as a psi-anchor to fight the Shadow King in the astral plane, but he was defeated; reveling in making Xavier suffer, he issued psychic attacks so intense that they manifested as physical damage, breaking Xavier's legs and crippling him in the process. Archangel, Colossus, Cyclops and Storm joined Jean in the astral plane to help Xavier, unaware of Legion's body nearby. Although they gave Xavier willpower and energy, the possessed Legion destroyed a large swath of Muir island; upon awakening, Xavier acknowledges that his physical damage has returned him to a paraplegic state. Forge uses Psylocke's psi-blade on Polaris, breaking the Shadow King's link to the nexus, after which his energy dissipated overcoming the X-Men. Xavier and Jean tried to absorb whatever they could and shield the others. Xavier offered the Shadow King a chance to redeem himself, but he opted for the void and Legion was left in a coma.

Psi-War
After the Onslaught incident in which Charles Xavier lost his powers, the Shadow King could return to the physical world since the psionic plane had lost its guardian. Posing as "Ananasi", the Shadow King took over the African tribe who worshiped Storm. After attacking one of her relatives, Psylocke took Storm to the astral plane to fight "Ananasi" only to find the villagers’ minds set up in a distinct pattern. Before they can discern the reasoning, "Ananasi" attacks Psylocke and brings up her past failures and how she was always considered a redundant Jean Grey-wannabe. Ainet finds Storm and tells her the truth, but "Ananasi" buries Storm under bones of her dead friends before she can tell Betsy the truth. Psylocke falls into "Ananasi"’s trap and accidentally hits one of the villagers with her psi-blade. This caused a chain reaction that cripples the entire psionic plan itself, damaging the collective subconscious of every being on Earth (the basis of the psi-plane) as well as all psi-sensitive in the corporeal world. Humans experienced déjà vu, nightmares, migraines or nosebleeds, and those born with psionic, telepathic or intuitive abilities were maimed; Jean and Nate Grey, Cable, Emma Frost, Chamber and Bianca LaNiege were devastated. "Maddie" Pryor (Nate Grey's psionic construct from Madelyne Pryor's psionic remnants) was obliterated, and Dr. Strange and Spider-Man were also affected while Psylocke is left as a discombobulated mess, as "Ananasi" reveals himself to be the Shadow King, now free of any opposition on the Psionic Plane. With the world's telepaths crippled, the Shadow King ascends to dominance and, one by one, begins to corrupt mankind. He explains to Psylocke that although he was defeated and thought dead by Charles Xavier at Muir Island, as long as one dark thought exists in man, he can live. He went into hibernation, for the lack of a better word. He eventually bids her farewell forever as he teleports away and Psylocke turns to stone and then falls apart. Yet the Crimson Dawn saves Psylocke once again and resurrects her, this time with an all black psi-form and the ability to command the shadows of the Psionic Plane, which allow her to go undetected by the Shadow King. She eventually confronts the Shadow King and pretends to be tempted by his offer to become the Shadow Queen to distract him while Storm freed the other X-Men. However Farouk saw through the ruse; Psylocke sent the X-Men to the physical world and takes the fight directly to the Shadow King, who stretches his powers to the maximum to infect every mind on Earth. Psylocke is intoxicated by the power, but keeps her focus and discovers that the Shadow King has left his nexus, the soul of every person on the Psionic Plane, exposed as his body unravels to reach every mind. Psylocke uses her shadows to contain the nexus and the Shadow King is trapped, but only as long as Psylocke focuses her telepathy on him, which means she can never use her powers again or else he will be set free. Psylocke leaves the Psionic Plane for the last time and reveals what happened to Storm.

Sometime later the Shadow King reached Psylocke's mind when she's forced to use Cerebro to cleansed Logan of the Death persona with a little push from each of Logan's closest friends, but Archangel experienced a metamorphosis of his own from his close contact to Apocalypse's handiwork. The Shadow King eventually managed to convince Betsy to release him in order to help Warren but before she reaches him, Warren himself mysteriously appears on her mind and stop her from setting him free, sending the Shadow King back to his prison when Betsy disconnected herself from Cerebro.

Freedom
The Shadow King was eventually released from his prison when Psylocke perished in combat with the mutant hunter, Vargas. Once again free, he possessed the Reavers and attempted to attack the X-Men. However, Rogue used her acquired memories as well as Sage's computer like mind and attacked the Shadow King, binding his core as Psylocke had done.

New Excalibur
Due to the events of House of M, the Shadow King was released from his prison and was able to escape to an alternate reality, Earth-6141. Once there, he possessed their version of Professor X and then corrupted the original X-Men (whom he called the Dark X-Men). He maintained constant telepathic contact and control over them and forced them to kill all the heroes of their world. The Scarlet Witch's Decimation Wave enabled the Shadow King to bring himself and his team to Earth-616 in order to gain revenge on those who had crossed him. He tried to kill Captain Britain with the controlled New Excalibur, but was again defeated by Psylocke (who was revived by her brother, Jamie Braddock). The Dark X-Men tried to free Xavier from his prison with the help of Lionheart. Lionheart sealed the Shadow King in the Dark Xavier's body, releasing the Shadow-X from his control and killed Dark Xavier therefore sending the Shadow King back to the Astral plane.<ref>New Excalibur #19. Marvel Comics.</ref>

X-Men: Worlds Apart
The Shadow King reappeared in Wakanda, where he killed a Wakandan priest and framed former New X-Men member Gentle. He then controlled Black Panther to confront his longtime enemy (and T'Challa's wife), Storm. The Shadow King intended to break Storm psychologically, forcing her to choose between the X-Men and her husband. He forced Cyclops to attack Emma Frost and the rest of the X-Men in California and forced the Black Panther to wreak havoc in Africa. While Storm raced to save the Black Panther and the X-Men, she recognized a third option: to take down the one responsible for making her choose. Storm defeated the Black Panther and flew with Gentle to San Francisco, taking down Gentle and the rest of the active X-Men (controlled by the Shadow King). She struck Cyclops (the Shadow King's host) with a bolt of lightning, stopping his heart and forcing the Shadow King to possess Storm. This was a trap; when he entered Storm's mind, the Shadow King found the panther god Bast waiting for him. Storm revealed that she allowed the Wakanda panther god to hide in her mind to avenge the Shadow King for violating T'Challa's mind. Bast essentially and literally devoured the Shadow King's astral form. Farouk's plan to cut Storm off from her relationships instead strengthened them.

Brotherhood of Evil Mutants
The Shadow King's nexus survived however and when he recuperated he took over a military base's nuclear facility to use its missiles, aiming them at Utopia and New York. The X-Force headed to the military base after losing contact with Deadpool (who was investigating the psychic emanations felt by Betsy), learning that the Shadow King controlled the base.

He told Psylocke that her mind is an open book to him, and releases Archangel from his psychic prison in Warren's memory in revenge; Archangel cuts off the Shadow King's "head", erasing Betsy's memory and enabling her to kill the man who was under the Shadow King's influence. The Shadow King gave a reporter photographs of Warren killing the military, forcing the squad to apprehend their teammate and seek help from Dark Beast. As Farouk, the Shadow King appeared as a member of Daken's Brotherhood of Evil Mutants (consisting of Sabretooth, Mystique, Skinless Man, the Blob from Earth-295, and the Omega Clan) in a plot to attack the X-Force.

He created an illusion of the Professor and Angel to catch Psylocke off-guard, expressing disappointment at the ease of defeating the warrior who caged him. Farouk was with the Brotherhood as they watched the apparent death of the X-Force. He, Creed and Daken showed Evan that his life was a computer-generated illusion and he was a clone of Apocalypse. The Brotherhood unsuccessfully planned to compel Evan to put on Apocalypse armor, make the Shadow King control him and destroy Jean Grey's school. Psylocke locked the Shadow King in Omega White's body and entrusted it to her brother, Captain Britain.

Apparently Brian or someone at his command had sealed the Shadow King's host body in a tomb in the Gobi Desert where it was eventually found in stasis erroneously trapped inside Omega Black's body by the Crimson Pirates and unwittingly released by their telepath, Bloody Bess. He possessed the Pirates except for Bess, who appealed to Nightcrawler for help. Nightcrawler and Bess fought the Pirates and the X-Men, who were controlled by the Shadow King. He was defeated when Bess and Psylocke threw off his mind control and sent Nightcrawler against him armed with Psylocke's psi-blade, which stunned him long enough to be interred again in Omega Black's body.

Psi-War II
The Shadow King has since been revealed to be imprisoned in the Astral Plane, but still trying to force his way out to the physical world. He began targeting psychics to build a web in order to escape the Astral Plane and the first one was Psylocke, who fell prey to him and would have released him if not for the intervention of Rogue, Old Man Logan, Warren, Bishop, Gambit and Fantomex. Knowing now that others psychics can fall prey too, Psylocke sends to the Astral Plane her teammates in order to defeat the Shadow King, unaware that he had changed, now half-human half-spider and is waiting for them. He also reveals that he has imprisoned in his realm the astral form of Professor Xavier.

As they arrive, they quickly fall into the Shadow King's illusions and if they don't break it their bodies and souls will fall under his control. Old Man Logan suddenly remembers everything and helps the other X-Men realize that the Shadow King is affecting their memories. As the room they are in transforms, they see three doors in front of them. Logan mentions that while the Shadow King is controlling things there are two minds involved in whatever they are in, which is how he figured out the play was fake. In the battle's final moments, Shadow King spread a psychic infection on London before the X-Men ultimately defeated him with Fantomex donating his body to Professor X's astral form while his mind remained in the Astral Plane.Astonishing X-Men (Vol. 4) #07. Marvel Comics. Professor Xavier now using the alias of X, controlled the psychic infection which was soon afterwards revealed to be actually Proteus which X unwittingly reconstituted back. X then convinced Psylocke to form a psychic network and draw its power to push back Proteus' influence, however the Shadow King had planted a portion of himself in Xavier's mind and took advantage of this strategy and accessed the network to escape from the Astral Plane through X's body. After the Shadow King defeated the X-Men, X managed to recover and worked together with Psylocke to create a deeper psychic network to defeated him once and for all. X erased the memories of all of the X-Men involved in his return save for Psylocke so she could watch over him in case the Shadow King wasn't truly gone from his mind.

Dawn of X
During the "Empyre" storyline, Amahl Farouk is among the psychic mutants that are summoned to Genosha to help deal with a seed pod-type bomb that is vulnerable to psychic attacks, and it's revealed that Amahl and the Shadow King are actually two different individuals. Having been born in Egypt Eyalet, to a merchant trader, during the sixteenth century, Amahl Farouk is a mutant whose psychic powers emerged at a young age. Amahl then used them to protect the market from thieves, until tragedy would eventually arrive to the market in the form of a plague. The young Amahl sat with his dying father and tried to use his telepathic powers to prevent the inevitable, suggesting that his telepathic powers likely allowed him to "feel" his father's death as partly his own. With his father dead and the market gone, the young mutant had nothing to tether him to the city until he was approached by the Shadow King, who promised the boy a chance to never be alone again. From that moment on, Amahl was immersed in darkness as he joined with the Shadow King. Also while Amahl Farouk himself has already been seen on Krakoa, it wasn't clear if the Shadow King was still a part of the mutant's life, until a group of young mutants finishes their training and head for the caves on Krakoa, far from their instructors. There, Amahl Farouk, clearly still possessed by the Shadow King, awaits them to listening intently to the young X-Men and doubtlessly planning something sinister for the youngest mutants.

In time, the Shadow King sets his plans in motion and begins seducing several young mutants who are unsure of themselves, including Gabrielle Kinney and Rahne Sinclair. However, Gabrielle begins to suspect Farouk and is subsequently killed by Rahne, whom he had placed under his mind control. Gabrielle is resurrected, and confronted by the senior New Mutants, Farouk draws them and Gabrielle's clique into the astral plane. The young mutants confront the Shadow King, encouraging Farouk to dissolve his connection with him, restoring his human mind and personality. Scarred by his connection with the Shadow King, Farouk leaves Krakoa, with the endorsement of the New Mutants, to undergo rehabilitation.

Powers and abilities
The Shadow King
Originally presented as a telepathic mutant second only to Professor X, the Shadow King is truly a multi-universal ethereal entity extending into each reality as a tendril of its larger self, spawned by the first nightmare and preying on the bodies of powerful psychics and using them to enslave others all the while feeding off their negative energy and causes them to slowly merge with his own essence. 
In its native form, the Shadow King is able to possess other beings and although he can be harmed psychically or by magic weapons, he is incapable of truly being killed or expelled permanently.

He can influence many individuals telepathically but typically chooses only one host to occupy with his disembodied spirit. This host body effectively becomes the Shadow King's own. The Shadow King can somehow physically repair damage to the host. Although taking a host gives him more power on the physical plane, it also makes him vulnerable. Killing the Shadow King's host can disperse his astral essence, and it may take months or even years for him to manifest his astral form again.

Amahl Farouk
Amahl Farouk is a powerful psychic mutant with the ability to read minds and project his own thoughts into the minds of others which enable him to create realistic telepathic illusions and cause people to experience events which are not actually occurring. His psychic powers might have gotten stronger after becoming a vessel to the Shadow King.

Reception
 In 2017, WhatCulture ranked Shadow King 8th in their "10 Most Evil X-Men Villains" list.

Other versions
In an alternate universe, the Shadow King conquered the Hellfire Club. In the Mutant X dimension, he merged with Professor Xavier to form an evil being.

Age of Apocalypse
In the "Age of Apocalypse" storyline, the Shadow King story is essentially unchanged. He assumes the guise of crime lord Amahl Farouk and encounters Charles Xavier; they wage a psychic battle on the astral plane which kills Farouk's body, forcing his mind to move there. When Xavier died, the Shadow King became an agent of Apocalypse and appeared as a cloudy face in a bottle in his sanctum.Age of Apocalypse #05. Marvel Comics. Apocalypse used him to hunt down resisting mutants with powerful psionic powers, and train those that do agree to come aboard.

The Shadow King was the first to sense the presence of Nate Grey, forcing Apocalypse to send Domino and her Bounty Hunters to capture or kill him. When Angel's assistant Karma was captured by Apocalypse's servants, the Shadow King psychically tortured her into revealing the location of Magneto's X-Men. He later attempted to read the mind of Bishop, but Bishop's memory of the original reality (Earth-616) was enough to expel the Shadow King from his mind. Finally, the Shadow King followed Nightcrawler to the sanctuary of Avalon by hiding in the mind of Dead Man Wade. There he took control of the minds of the many of Avalon's mutant and human refugees, causing great carnage. Nightcrawler, with the assistance of the psychic and Shadow King's former student Damask, the time-stopping Switchback and Mystique, was able to physically teleport into the astral plane and defeat the Shadow King. The casualties caused by the Shadow King's attack were enough to convince Destiny to accompany Nightcrawler and the X-Men on a mission to Apocalypse's stronghold; Following his defeat on Avalon, the Shadow King was next seen reporting to Apocalypse about Domino's failure to capture Nate Grey and inform Apocalypse about the destruction of the Southwest Kingdom by the Eurasian High Council's radioactive bombs.

After Weapon X betrayed the X-Men and become the heir of Apocalypse, the Shadow King became his agent and chief telepath, though there are some hierarchy issues between him and Weapon X.

Ultimate Marvel
In the Ultimate Marvel series, Amahl Farouk the Shadow King appeared as Storm's lover and the leader of the group of thieves to which she and Lady Deathstrike belonged. Storm sent him into a coma after accidentally electrocuting him. His mind went to another dimension, where he encountered the Brood and others and became the Shadow King. After returning in the present-day, he subtly manipulated Storm's dreams, causing Ororo to write down her inflicted visions in an online play called "The Shadow King". Soon, Farouk took direct action, dragging Ororo into the astral plane after a tiring battle and confronting her about her past. Once he revealed the circumstances of his transformation into the Shadow King, he attacked the X-Men with his Brood army; however, Storm's willingness to let go of the past allowed her to once again attack Farouk, but intentionally, and his form disappeared from the plane, implying that he had died in the physical realm. His attack on the X-Men with the Brood was also revealed to be a ruse on Farouk's part.

X-Men '92
In Marvel's 2015 Secret Wars storyline, the 1992 X-Men animated series was adapted into a limited series where this reality was made into the Battleworld domain of Westchester. In the series, Cassandra Nova runs a rehabilitation center for former villains, but is secretly possessed by the Shadow King. He planned on killing the Battlezone's baron, Senator Kelly, but is stopped when X-Force rescues the X-Men.

In other media
Television
Live action

 Amahl Farouk/Shadow King appears as the main antagonist in the FX TV series Legion, portrayed primarily by Aubrey Plaza in the first season (in the form of Lenny Busker) and Navid Negahban in the second and third seasons (in his original likeness). Prior to the revelation of the character's identity, he was referred to by David Haller as "the Devil with the Yellow Eyes" (portrayed by Quinton Boisclair). The Shadow King takes several forms over the course of the series other than his real form, including the aforementioned "Devil" form of an obese man with thin, long limbs, Haller's childhood dog King, the "Angry Boy" (portrayed by Devyn Dalton) who is a manifestation of the title character from the children's book The World's Angriest Boy in the World, Haller's friend in the Clockworks Institute - Busker, and a friend from his youth named Benny (portrayed by Kirby Morrow). Originally a mutant enemy of David's father, the Shadow King's consciousness escaped his death and latched on to David as a kind of psychic parasite, using David's mutant abilities to grow stronger. His presence influenced David's mental instability and the way he perceives reality. In the second season, Farouk assumes his true appearance during his quest to find his original body, which resembles that of his comics counterpart, being of Middle-Eastern appearance, sporting three-piece suits and the signature circular sunglasses, though lacks the fez (instead having a semi-balding head of hair) and isn't morbidly obese (unlike his appearance as "the Devil with Yellow Eyes"). In season 3, however, his younger self wears the fez.

Animation
Shadow King appears in two episodes of X-Men: The Animated Series (1992–97), voiced by Maurice Dean Wint. In flashbacks he is the first evil mutant faced by a younger Charles Xavier, who banished his spirit to the astral plane. Farouk is depicted as an athletic, middle-aged bearded man instead of his bald, obese appearance in the comics.
Shadow King appears in the Wolverine and the X-Men episode, "Overflow", voiced by Kevin Michael Richardson. In a flashback, Farouk takes in Ororo to steal for him until Professor X defeats him, the battle destroying his body. In the present, he finds his way to and possesses Storm, forcing her to see Africa burning; she tries to extinguish the fire, unaware that her efforts are the real cause of the destruction. The X-Men confront the Shadow King, allowing anyone he could use as a host to get away, weakening him enough for Emma Frost, fighting him on the astral plane, to apparently destroy him with a telepathic sword.

Video games
Shadow King is one of three primary villains in the video game X-Men Legends'', voiced by Dorian Harewood. He first traps Ilyana in the Astral Plane to lure Xavier into a trap.
Shadow King appears as a playable character in Marvel Snap.

References

External links
 Shadow King at Marvel.com
 Shadow King at Marvel Appendix
 Age of Apocalypse at Marvel.com
 

Characters created by John Byrne (comics)
Characters created by Chris Claremont
Comics characters introduced in 1979
Fictional Egyptian people
Fictional crime bosses
Fictional characters with spirit possession or body swapping abilities
Marvel Comics male supervillains
Marvel Comics mutants
Marvel Comics telepaths
X-Men supporting characters